Detlef Kleuker (4 July 1922 in Flensburg - 15 February 1988 in Brackwede) was a German organ builder who founded Detlev Kleuker Orgelbau.

Hans-Detlef Kleuker studied building organs at Emanuel Kemper in Lübeck. After his master certification in 1955, Kleuker established his own organ building company in Brackwede. He built about 250 organs over the next three decades, in addition, restorations  were carried out. Kleuker invented new methods in organ construction and incorporated the use of new materials. His organs tend to show a modern edged appearance, while their dispositions remained more traditional.

In 1986 Siegfried Bäune took over the company. The company remained in existence until 1991/92.

Literature
  
 Detlef Kleuker Orgelbau. Detlef Kleuker Orgelbau, Brackwede 1970 (Catalogue).

See also
A partial list of organs built by Kleuker can be found on the corresponding German website Detlef Kleuker.

1922 births
1988 deaths
German pipe organ builders
Musical instrument manufacturing companies of Germany